GNU Hurd or Hurd, is a Unix-like kernel that sets the base for the GNU operating system.

Hurd may also refer to:

Places
Hurd Peninsula, in the South Shetland Islands
Hurd's Deep, submarine valley in the English Channel
Hurds Lake, Ontario
Hurds Pond, a lake in Maine
Renfrew/Hurds Lake Water Aerodrome, also called Hurds Lake Water Aerodrome, in Ontario, Canada

Other uses
Hurd (band), a Mongolian heavy metal band
Hurd (surname)
Hemp hurds, the left-over fragments of hemp stems and stalk after removal of fibers
"The Hurds", or "Odds and Ends", a German fairy tale collected by the Brothers Grimm

See also
Herd (disambiguation)
Heard (disambiguation)
Hird (disambiguation)
Hurdy-gurdy